Hemish Bandara Ilangaratne (born 27 July 1987) is an English former first-class cricketer.

Ilangaratne was born at Derby in July 1987. He played minor counties cricket for Hertfordshire from 2006–11, making four appearances in the Minor Counties Championship. Of Sri-Lankan descent, Ilangaratne made a single appearance in first-class cricket in Sri Lanka for Kurunegala Youth Cricket Club against Singha Sports Club at Kurunegala in November 2006, though he was not called upon to bat or bowl in the match.

References

External links

1987 births
Living people
Cricketers from Derby
English people of Sri Lankan descent
Alumni of Durham University
Alumni of the University of Birmingham
English cricketers
Hertfordshire cricketers
Kurunegala Youth Cricket Club cricketers